Sweden held a general election on 21 September 1952.

Results

Regional results

Percentage share

By votes

Constituency results

Percentage share

By votes

Results by cities and rural municipalities
Since hundreds ceased in time for the 1952 election, results were counted in smaller municipalities instead. Since those rural municipality lists would take up too much space, this lists the cities one by one and the overall rural municipality vote in one chart for each constituency.

Blekinge

Gothenburg and Bohuslän

Bohuslän

Gothenburg

Gotland

Gävleborg

Halland

Jämtland

Jönköping

Kalmar

Kopparberg

Kristianstad

Kronoberg

Malmöhus

Malmö area

Malmöhus County

Norrbotten

Skaraborg

Stockholm

Stockholm (city)

Stockholm County

Södermanland

Uppsala

Värmland

Västerbotten

Västernorrland

Västmanland

Älvsborg

Älvsborg N

Älvsborg S

Örebro

Östergötland

References

General elections in Sweden